Jan Schwarz (born 27 September 1958 in Třebíč, Vysočina Region, Czechoslovakia) is Czech theologian, a spiritual leader, journalist and writer. He was the seventh Patriarch of the Czechoslovak Hussite Church from 2001 to 2005.

In 2000, he had been assigned as the press spokesman and in 2001 as the head of the Church of the church. His rule was marked by serious rambling between rival factions some refusing his patriarchy and threatening the division of the church. In 2005, he appeared in front of the church's Episcopal Central Council where he tended his resignation from the patriarchy. He was also engaged in journalistic and writer activities.

The ecclesiastical council appointed Bishop Mgr. Štěpán Klásek as an interim administrator to prepare for the election of a new patriarch of the church. On 23 September 2006, Tomáš Butta was elected, in the first round of voting with absolute majority as eighth Patriarch of the Church.

Notes 

1958 births
Living people
People from Třebíč
Czechoslovak Hussite Church bishops
21st-century archbishops